Ruth Jane Forrest (born 4 March 1962 in Burnie) is an independent member of the Tasmanian Legislative Council in the electoral division of Murchison.

Forrest was first elected in May 2005. Following her first six-year term, she was the only candidate to stand for election in Murchison in the 2011 periodic elections, and was re-elected unopposed on 7 May 2011. She was re-elected in 2017.

Forrest is the Tasmanian Legislative Council's Chair of Committees.

In October 2019 Forrest was named one of The Australian Financial Review's 100 Women of Influence in the category of Public Policy.

She has a background, and an ongoing interest, in nursing and midwifery.

References

External links
Ruth Forrest's maiden speech to parliament

Parliament of Tasmania biography
Parliament of Tasmania data sheet

1962 births
Living people
Independent members of the Parliament of Tasmania
Members of the Tasmanian Legislative Council
21st-century Australian politicians
Women members of the Tasmanian Legislative Council
21st-century Australian women politicians